Peter Okumu (born 9 October 1962) is a Ugandan boxer. He competed in the men's welterweight event at the 1984 Summer Olympics.

References

1962 births
Living people
Ugandan male boxers
Olympic boxers of Uganda
Boxers at the 1984 Summer Olympics
Place of birth missing (living people)
Welterweight boxers